XETKR-AM is a radio station on 1480 AM in Monterrey, Nuevo León, Mexico, licensed in Guadalupe. It is owned by Multimedios Radio and is known as TKR.

History
XENJ-AM received its concession on March 21, 1961. It operated from Guadalupe and was owned by Remigio González González. Radio Triunfos, S.A. became the concessionaire in July 1964, with the callsign changing to the current XETKR. Daytime power was raised from 1,000 to 5,000 watts by the 1980s and then to 10,000 in the 1990s.

References

1961 establishments in Mexico
Multimedios Radio
Radio stations established in 1961
Radio stations in Monterrey
Regional Mexican radio stations
Spanish-language radio stations